The FIS Alpine World Ski Championships 1997 were held in Sestriere, northwestern Italy, from February 3–15, 1997.

Nine years later, the area would later host the alpine events for the 2006 Winter Olympics in Turin.

Men's competitions

Downhill

Date: February 8

Super-G

Date: February 3

Giant Slalom

Date: February 12

Slalom

Date: February 15

Combination

Date: February 6

Women's competitions

Downhill

Date: February 15

Super-G

Date: February 11

Giant Slalom

Date: February 9

Slalom

Date: February 5

Combination

Date: February 15

Medals table
References

External links
FIS-ski.com - results - 1997 World Championships - Sestriere, Italy
FIS-ski.com - results - World Championships

FIS Alpine World Ski Championships
FIS Alpine World Ski Championships
1997
A
Alpine skiing competitions in Italy
February 1997 sports events in Europe